State Route 706 (SR 706) is an east–west state route in western Ohio.  The western terminus of SR 706 is at SR 29 in the hamlet of Pasco, and its eastern terminus is at a T-intersection with SR 235 just south of Quincy.

Route description
SR 706 starts at its junction with SR 29 in the unincorporated community of Pasco, at the northwest corner of Cedar Point Cemetery. Departing the intersection to the east, SR 706 passes along the north side of the cemetery, meeting Pasco-Montra Road in the process. East of there, the highway passes through Shelby County's Perry Township amidst a rural landscape dominated by farmland, with the occasional house appearing along the way. SR 706 intersects Ferree Road, then continues east for a period, passing Johnston-Slagle Road on its way to a T-intersection with Tawawa-Maplewood Road. After a stretch, SR 706 arrives at its intersection with Logan-Shelby Road, which, fittingly, serves as the boundary between Shelby County and Logan County.  

Now across the county line, and into Miami Township, SR 706 traverses eastward through more of farm country. Arriving at its intersection with Logan County Road 68, SR 706 turns north briefly, then curves back to the east.

History
The SR 706 designation was applied in 1937.  The highway followed the same routing then that it does today.  The only differences between then and now are the designations of the highways that mark SR 706's endpoints.  The western terminus of the highway in 1937 was at SR 54.  Today, that highway is now designated as SR 29.  As for the eastern terminus of SR 706, it was originally at SR 69.  Now, that highway is designated as SR 235.

Major intersections

References

706
Transportation in Logan County, Ohio
Transportation in Shelby County, Ohio